Sven Joss (born 18 July 1994) is a Swiss footballer who plays for FC Konolfingen in the Swiss fifth-tier 2. Liga Interregional.

Career
In July 2015, he joined Thun on loan from Young Boys for one year until the end of the 2015–16 season. This agreement was extended by one year in May 2016. After having made three appearances for Thun in the 2016-17 season, he was recalled after all on 8 August 2016 to replace Florent Hadergjonaj who left he club on the same day.

References

External links
 

1994 births
Footballers from Bern
Living people
Swiss men's footballers
Association football defenders
BSC Young Boys players
FC Thun players
Swiss 1. Liga (football) players
Swiss Super League players
2. Liga Interregional players
Swiss Challenge League players